Holothuria tubulosa, the cotton-spinner or tubular sea cucumber, is a species of sea cucumber in the family Holothuriidae.  It is the type species of the genus Holothuria and is placed in the subgenus Holothuria, making its full name Holothuria (Holothuria) tubulosa.

Description
It is roughly cylindrical with a flattened base on which there are three longitudinal rows of tube feet. It has a tough, leathery skin. The general colour is a shade of brown and the surface is covered with numerous dark-coloured, conical, thorn-like projections known as papillae. It often appears greyish, as it secretes a protective film of mucus to which bits of seaweed and sediment may adhere. It has a fringe of short, flattened tentacles around the mouth at the anterior end and an anus at the posterior end.

Distribution and habitat
Holothuria tubulosa is found in temperate regions of the eastern Atlantic Ocean as far north as the Bay of Biscay and in the Mediterranean Sea, where it is abundant.

Biology

Holothuria tubulosa feeds on detritus, algae and plankton. It uses its tube feet to move across the surface or adhere to rocks.

Holothuria tubulosa is dioecious, with each individual being either male or female but with no difference between them in external appearance. In a study in the Mediterranean Sea, a mass spawning event was observed in the afternoons of the two days in August 2003 that coincided with the full moon. Large numbers of mature individuals simultaneously adopted the spawning position, rearing their anterior ends up and leaving only the hind third of their body in contact with the seabed. This raises their genital orifices, situated just below the mouth, clear of the substrate to allow for maximum dispersal of the gametes. First, some individuals, believed to be males, emitted a whitish fluid which gradually dispersed in the surrounding water. Next, a smaller number of individuals, believed to be female, emitted a more viscous fluid, perhaps in response to the release of the male gametes. Each release lasted about 30 minutes.

The fertilised eggs hatch in about 24 hours and the developing larvae are planktonic. They feed on microscopic algae and pass through several stages over the course of a few weeks before settling on the seabed and undergoing metamorphosis into juveniles.

Along with Parastichopus regalis, Holothuria tubulosa is the preferred host of Carapus acus, which shares a commensal association with the sea cucumber.

Uses
Sea cucumbers are used for food in some countries, particularly Taiwan, China, Singapore, Korea and Norway. There is a commercial fishery in Turkey and a closed season is imposed in August and September to allow the animals to spawn. Holothuria tubulosa is one of the species collected by divers, who can gather 2000 to 3000 in a day. The sea cucumbers are either sun dried, oven dried, or frozen before being exported.
Sea cucumbers have high amounts of health benefits to humans, they provide high amounts of protein and fatty acids. They are mostly harvested in Southeast Asian countries where in the 1980s they became a popular resource to use in nutritional, biological, and pharmaceutical products. Holothuria tubulosa has been investigated as a new source for omega-3 and omega-6 fatty acids, and the production of bioactive peptides.

References 

Holothuriidae
Fauna of the Atlantic Ocean
Fauna of the Mediterranean Sea
Animals described in 1791
Taxa named by Johann Friedrich Gmelin